Beesands is a small settlement located midway between Hallsands and Torcross on the coast of Start Bay in South Devon, England. It is best known as a tourist destination, but is still a fishing village that concentrates mainly on crab and lobster fishing through Britannia Fisheries. There is an Anglican chapel dedicated to St Andrew in the village. Behind the beach, north of the settlement is a freshwater lake known as Beesands Ley, smaller but similar in ecology to Slapton Ley about a kilometre to the north.

Keith Richards' family regularly spent holidays at Beesands during the 1950s. Keith Richards and Mick Jagger's first public performance was at The Cricket Inn in the village.

References

Villages in South Hams
Beaches of Devon
Stokenham